George Morley Young (December 11, 1870 – May 27, 1932) was a United States representative from North Dakota and a judge of the United States Customs Court.

Early life and education

Young was born on December 11, 1870, in Lakelet, Ontario, Canada. While he was a boy, his family moved to the United States and settled in St. Charles, Michigan. He attended the public schools and received a Bachelor of Laws degree from the University of Minnesota Law School in 1894. He was admitted to the bar the same year and commenced practice in Valley City, North Dakota. He served as member of the board of aldermen for Valley City from 1898 to 1899. He served as member of the North Dakota House of Representatives from 1900 to 1902. He served in the North Dakota Senate from 1904 to 1908 and was President pro Tempore during the entire term.

Congressional service

Young was elected as a Republican to the United States House of Representatives of the 63rd United States Congress and to the five succeeding Congresses and served from March 4, 1913, to September 2, 1924, when he resigned to accept a judicial position.

Federal Judicial Service

Young was nominated by President Calvin Coolidge on May 19, 1924, to serve as a Member of the Board of General Appraisers, to the seat vacated by Member Eugene Gano Hay. He was confirmed by the United States Senate on May 23, 1924, and received his commission on May 24, 1924. Young was reassigned by operation of law to serve as an Associate Justice (Judge from June 17, 1930) of the United States Customs Court on May 28, 1926, to a new seat authorized by 44 Stat. 669. He served as Presiding Judge in 1932. His service terminated on May 27, 1932, due to his death in New York City, New York. He was succeeded by Judge William John Keefe. He was interred in Woodbine Cemetery in Valley City.

References

Sources

 
 

1870 births
1932 deaths
University of Minnesota Law School alumni
Members of the Board of General Appraisers
Judges of the United States Customs Court
Canadian emigrants to the United States
Republican Party North Dakota state senators
Republican Party members of the North Dakota House of Representatives
People from Valley City, North Dakota
People from St. Charles, Michigan
People from Huron County, Ontario
United States Article I federal judges appointed by Calvin Coolidge
20th-century American judges
20th-century American politicians
Republican Party members of the United States House of Representatives from North Dakota